The 1872 United States presidential election in Rhode Island took place on November 5, 1872. All contemporary 37 states were part of the 1872 United States presidential election. The state voters chose four electors to the Electoral College, which selected the president and vice president.

Rhode Island was won by the Republican nominees, incumbent President Ulysses S. Grant of Illinois and his running mate Senator Henry Wilson of Massachusetts. Grant and Wilson defeated the Liberal Republican and Democratic nominees, former Congressman Horace Greeley of New York and his running mate former Senator and Governor Benjamin Gratz Brown of Missouri by a margin of 43.88%.

With 71.94% of the popular vote, Rhode Island would be Grant's third strongest victory in terms of percentage in the popular vote after Vermont and South Carolina. It remains the best Republican performance in Rhode Island's history and the second-best by any candidate after Lyndon B. Johnson’s 80.87% in 1964.

Results

See also
 United States presidential elections in Rhode Island

References

Rhode Island
1872
1872 Rhode Island elections